The Moscow School of the Order of St Catherine was a girls' school in Moscow, Russia, between 1802 and 1918. It was a fashionable girl school for students from noble and rich burgher families (divided in different classes until 1842), which was the Moscow equivalent to the Smolny Institute of St Petersburg. It belonged to the first educational institutions in Moscow.

References

 Московское училище ордена Св. Екатерины 1803–1903 гг.: Исторический очерк. Составлен по поручению Совета Училища Комиссией преподавателей под общей редакцией инспектора классов В. А. Вагнера. М., [печатня А.Снегиревой], 1903. VIII, [4], 560 с.; 3 л. портретов.

Charities based in Russia
Social welfare charities
1802 establishments in the Russian Empire
1918 disestablishments in Russia
19th century in Moscow
Schools in Moscow
Educational institutions established in 1802
Girls' schools in Russia
Cultural heritage monuments of federal significance in Moscow